Warren is a British sitcom, which aired on BBC One between February and April 2019. The series stars Martin Clunes, Lisa Millett, Tim Preston and Oscar Morgan in the main roles. It was written by Jimmy Donny Cosgrove and Paul McKenna. The BBC did not commission any further series after the first.

Synopsis 
The sitcom shows the life of the angry, impatient, selfish and  abrasive driving instructor Warren Thompson (Martin Clunes), after moving in with his partner Anne Humphries (Lisa Millett) and her two teenage sons Charlie (Tim Preston) and Danny (Oscar Morgan) in Preston, after her father, Bill (David Hargreaves) falls ill.

Cast 
 Martin Clunes as Warren Thompson: An angry, impatient, selfish and abrasive driving instructor who is Anne's partner, Charlie and Danny's step-father and Ian and Paula's neighbour. He is loosely based on Cosgrove's father and also a character from one of his short films called "Warren Thompson Driving School" (which is also the name of the character's driving school).
 Lisa Millett as Anne Humphries: Warren's partner who is Charlie and Danny's mother.
 Tim Preston as Charlie Humphries: Anne's eldest son and Danny's brother.
 Oscar Morgan as Danny Humphries: Anne's youngest son, Charlie's brother and Jenny's boyfriend.
 Neil Edmond as Ian: Paula's husband and Warren's next-door neighbour.
 Maya Sondhi as Paula: Ian's wife and Warren's next-door neighbour.
 Emily Coates as Jenny: Danny's girlfriend.
 David Hargreaves as Bill: Anne's father and Sheila's husband.
 Judith Barker as Sheila: Anne's mother and Bill's wife.

Episodes

Reception 
Warren received mixed reviews, with some viewers calling it "uncomfortable", while The Telegraph called it "the final nail in the coffin for British sitcom".

Notes

References

External links
 
 
 

2010s British sitcoms
2010s British workplace comedy television series
2019 British television series debuts
2019 British television series endings
BBC television sitcoms
Preston, Lancashire
English-language television shows
Television series about dysfunctional families
Television shows set in Lancashire